Rajendra Prasad Yadav was an MLA from the Hasanpur constituency of Bihar from 1985 to 1990. He was a Minister of State in the Bihar Government. He died in the year 2018 and was cremated with full state honours. He had a daughter (eldest) followed by three sons. His eldest son, Shri Chhatrapati Yadav who is an active politician and is an MLA from the Khagaria constituency of Bihar (2020 Bihar State Elections).

References

Bihari politicians
Indian National Congress politicians
2018 deaths
Year of birth missing
Indian National Congress politicians from Bihar